The Mount Olive Township School District is a comprehensive community public school district that serves students in kindergarten through twelfth grade from Mount Olive Township, in Morris County, New Jersey, United States.

As of the 2018–19 school year, the district, comprising six schools, had an enrollment of 4,643 students and 357.5 classroom teachers (on an FTE basis), for a student–teacher ratio of 13.0:1.

The district is classified by the New Jersey Department of Education as being in District Factor Group "GH", the third-highest of eight groupings. District Factor Groups organize districts statewide to allow comparison by common socioeconomic characteristics of the local districts. From lowest socioeconomic status to highest, the categories are A, B, CD, DE, FG, GH, I and J.

In 2010, the district eliminated D as a passing grade for its middle- and high-schoolers. The district also instituted a rule requiring anyone who earned a D or an F in a course to retake that course.

Schools
Schools in the district (with 2018–19 enrollment data from the National Center for Education Statistics) are:
Elementary schools
Mountain View Elementary School with 501 students in grades PreK-5
Melissa Kolenski, Principal
Sandshore Elementary School with 449 students in grades K-5
Jennifer Curry, Acting Principal
Chester M. Stephens Elementary School with 657 students in grades K-5
Nicole Musarra, Principal
Tinc Road Elementary School with 459 students in grades K-5
Mark Grilo, Principal
Middle school
Mount Olive Middle School with 1,064 students in grades 6-8
James Kramer, Principal
High school
Mount Olive High School with 1,503 students in grades 9-12
Kevin Moore, Principal

Administration
Core members of the district's administration are:
Dr. Robert R. Zywicki, Superintendent
Gail Libby, Business Administrator
Lynn Jones, Board Secretary

Board of education
The district's board of education, with nine members, sets policy and oversees the fiscal and educational operation of the district through its administration. As a Type II school district, the board's trustees are elected directly by voters to serve three-year terms of office on a staggered basis, with three seats up for election each year held (since 2012) as part of the November general election. The board appoints a superintendent to oversee the day-to-day operation of the district.

References

External links
Mount Olive Township School District
 
Mount Olive Township School District, National Center for Education Statistics

Mount Olive Township, New Jersey
New Jersey District Factor Group GH
School districts in Morris County, New Jersey